Ida Grove is a city in Ida County, Iowa, United States. The population was 2,051 at the time of the 2020 census. It is the county seat of Ida County.

History
Founded in 1871, the town now known as "Old Ida Grove" was located on the north side of the river. However, when the railroad was built through the neighborhood in 1877 on the south side, Ida Grove was relocated there.

Ida Grove was incorporated on May 31, 1878, and was named for the county, which was named for Mount Ida, Greece.

The Ida Grove post office contains an oil on linen mural, Preparation for the First County Fair in Ida Grove–1872, painted by Andrene Kauffman in 1940. Federally commissioned murals were produced from 1934 to 1943 in the United States through the Section of Fine Arts, of the Treasury Department.

Geography
Ida Grove is located on US Route 59 and Iowa Highway 175 at the confluence of Odebolt Creek with Maple River. The Moorehead Pioneer Park and reservoir are located across the Maple River north of the city.

Demographics

2010 census
As of the census of 2010, there were 2,142 people, 966 households, and 590 families living in the city. The racial makeup of the city was 98.2% White, 0.3% African American, 0.2% Native American, 0.1% Asian, 0.5% from other races, and 0.7% from two or more races. Hispanic or Latino of any race were 0.8% of the population.

There were 966 households, of which 26.8% had children under the age of 18 living with them, 47.3% were married couples living together, 10.1% had a female householder with no husband present, 3.6% had a male householder with no wife present, and 38.9% were non-families. 34.8% of all households were made up of individuals, and 17.3% had someone living alone who was 65 years of age or older. The average household size was 2.17 and the average family size was 2.76.

The median age in the city was 46.7 years. 23.7% of residents were under the age of 18; 5.9% were between the ages of 18 and 24; 18.5% were from 25 to 44; 28.2% were from 45 to 64; and 23.6% were 65 years of age or older. The gender makeup of the city was 47.8% male and 52.2% female.

2000 census
As of the census of 2000, there were 2,350 people, 1,017 households, and 639 families living in the city. The racial makeup of the city was 98.94% White, 0.09% African American, 0.04% Native American, 0.17% Asian, 0.21% from other races, and 0.55% from two or more races. Hispanic or Latino of any race were 0.64% of the population.

There were 1,017 households, out of which 26.8% had children under the age of 18 living with them, 52.7% were married couples living together, 7.9% had a female householder with no husband present, and 37.1% were non-families. 34.5% of all households were made up of individuals, and 18.3% had someone living alone who was 65 years of age or older. The average household size was 2.25 and the average family size was 2.88.

23.9% are under the age of 18, 6.1% from 18 to 24, 23.6% from 25 to 44, 23.3% from 45 to 64, and 23.1% who were 65 years of age or older. The median age was 43 years. For every 100 females, there were 87.8 males. For every 100 females age 18 and over, there were 82.6 males.

The median income for a household in the city was $35,341, and the median income for a family was $46,213. Males had a median income of $31,185 versus $19,135 for females. The per capita income for the city was $20,698. About 4.6% of families and 7.7% of the population were below the poverty line, including 9.6% of those under age 18 and 6.5% of those age 65 or over.

Education
Ida Grove is a part of the Odebolt–Arthur–Battle Creek–Ida Grove Community School District. It was formerly a part of the Battle Creek–Ida Grove Community School District, which was established in 1994, until its merger with the Odebolt–Arthur Community School District on July 1, 2018. Schools serving the community include OABCIG Elementary Ida Grove, OABCIG Middle School in Odebolt and OABCIG High School in Ida Grove. They are known as the Falcons.

Notable people

 Joel Dreessen, tight end for the Denver Broncos of the National Football League.
 Harold Hughes, Governor of Iowa (1963–1969), U.S. Senator (1969–1975), and 1972 Presidential candidate.
 Mildred Lillie, California Court of Appeal Presiding Justice and Richard Nixon's choice for the first woman to serve on the U.S. Supreme Court (nomination withdrawn)
 George Pipgras, Major League Baseball player, umpire and member of the New York Yankees first World Series championship team in 1923

References

External links

 
City of Ida Grove, Iowa
City-Data Comprehensive Statistical Data and more about Ida Grove

Cities in Iowa
Cities in Ida County, Iowa
County seats in Iowa